Beja is a city and a municipality in the Alentejo region, Portugal. The city proper had a population of 21,658 in 2001.

The municipality is the capital of the Beja District. The present Mayor is Paulo Arsénio, elected by the Socialist Party with an absolute majority in the 2017 Portuguese Local Elections. The municipal holiday is Ascension Day. The Portuguese Air Force has an airbase in the area – the Air Base No. 11.

History

Situated on a  hill, commanding a strategic position over the vast plains of the Baixo Alentejo, Beja was already an important place in antiquity. Already inhabited in Celtic times, the town was later named Pax Julia by Julius Caesar in 48 BCE, when he made peace with the Lusitanians. He raised the town to be the capital of the southernmost province of Lusitania (Santarém and Braga were the other capitals of the conventi). During the reign of emperor Augustus the thriving town became Pax Augusta. It was already then a strategic road junction.

When the Visigoths took over the region, they called the town Paca (a direct derivation or shortening of the Latin Pax or Pace-Augusta) which then became the seat of a bishopric. Saint Aprígio (died in 530) became the first Visigothic bishop of Paca. The town fell to the invading Umayyad army in 713. Paca, was then adapted to Arabic Baja ( there's no sound for "p" in Arabic), and eventually became Beja.

Starting in 910 there were successive attempts of conquest and reconquest by the Christian kings. With the collapse of the Umayyad Caliphate of Córdoba in 1031, Beja became a taifa, an independent Muslim-ruled principality. In 1144 the governor of Beja, Sidray ibn Wazir, helped the rebellion of the Murīdūn (disciples) led by Abul-Qasim Ahmad ibn al-Husayn al-Quasi in the Algarve against power of Seville. In 1150 the town was captured by an army of the Almohads, who annexed it to their North African empire. It was retaken in 1162 by Fernão Gonçalves, leading the army of the Portuguese king Afonso I. It must have been abandoned by the Portuguese because in 1172 Gerald the Mercenary captured the town from the Muslims and before departing from it the medieval Arab city was reduced to rubble and left desolate. In 1175 Beja was recaptured again by the Almohads. It stayed under Muslim rule till 1234 when king Sancho II finally recaptured the town from the Moors.

All these wars depopulated the town and gradually reduced it to rubble. Only with Manuel I in 1521 did Beja again reach the status of city. It was attacked and occupied by the Portuguese and the Spanish armies during the Portuguese Restoration War (1640–1667).

Beja became again the head of a bishopric in 1770, more than a thousand years after the fall of the Visigothic city. In 1808 Napoleonic troops under General Junot sacked the city and massacred the inhabitants.

Geography

Climate
Due to its southernmost inland location with the descending winds of the subtropics and low precipitation, especially in summer, the city has a hot-summer Mediterranean climate (Köppen: Csa). It is the hottest main city in Portugal and one of the hottest places in Europe during summer. Between 2001 and 2018 it had the hottest summer of any main city in the country. Although mild by European standards, Beja has relatively cool winters, while summers are long and hot.

Snow is rare but may occur on a few occasions in a century, the last being on January 10, 2019. The year 2005 was particularly dry in Portugal and Beja suffered devastating forest fires in the surrounding rural areas contributing to the desertification that affects Alentejo.

Human geography

Administratively, the municipality is divided into 11 civil parishes (freguesias):
 Albernoa e Trindade
 Baleizão
 Beja (Salvador e Santa Maria da Feira)
 Beja (Santiago Maior e São João Baptista)
 Beringel
 Cabeça Gorda
 Nossa Senhora das Neves
 Salvada e Quintos
 Santa Clara de Louredo
 Santa Vitória e Mombeja
 São Matias
 Trigaches e São Brissos

International relations

Beja is twinned with:

Architecture

Castle 

The Castle of Beja on top of the hill can be seen from afar and dominates the town. It was built, together with the town walls, under the reign of King Diniz in the 13th century over the remains of a Roman castellum that had been fortified by the Moors. It consists of battlement walls with four square corner towers and a central granite and marble keep (Torre de Menagem), with its height of 40 m the highest in Portugal. The top of the keep can be accessed via a spiral staircase with 197 steps, passing three stellar-vaulted rooms with Gothic windows. The merlons of the machicolation around the keep are topped with small pyramids. Standing on the battlements, one has a sensational panorama of the surrounding landscape. One can also glimpse the remains of the city walls that once had forty turrets and five gates. The castle now houses a small military museum.

The square in front of the castle is named after Gonçalo Mendes da Maia or O Lidador, a brave knight killed in the battle against the Moors in 1170.

Visigothic Museum
The whitewashed Latin-Visigothic church of Santo Amaro, dedicated to Saint Amaro, standing next to the castle, is one of just four pre-Romanesque churches left in Portugal. Some parts date from the 6th century and the interior columns and capitals are carved with foliages and geometric designs from the 7th century. Especially the column with birds attacking a snake is of particular note. It houses today a small archaeological museum with Visigothic art.

Museum of Queen Eleanor
This regional museum was set up in 1927 and 1928 in the former Convent of Our Lady of the Conception (Convento de Nossa Senhora da Conceição) of the Order of Poor Ladies (dissolved in 1834), gradually expanding its collection. This Franciscan convent had been established in 1459 by Infante Fernando, Duke of Viseu and duke of Beja, next to his ducal palace. The construction continued until 1509.

It is an impressive building with a late-Gothic lattice-worked architrave running along the building. This elegant architrave resembles somewhat the architrave of the Monastery of Batalha, even if there are some early-Manueline influences. Above the entrance porch on the western façade is an ajimez window (a mullioned window) in Manueline and Moorish style in the room of the abbess, originating from the demolished palace of the dukes of Beja. The entrance door is embedded under an ogee arch. A square bell-tower and a spire with crockets tower above the complex. The convent has been classified as a national monument.

The entrance hall leads to the sumptuously gilded Baroque chapel, consisting of a single nave under a semi-circular vault. Three altars (one of the 17th century, dedicated to St. John the Evangelist, and two of the 18th century, dedicated to St. Christopher and St. Bento) are decorated with gilded woodwork (talha dourada). The fourth altar, dedicated to St. John the Baptist, was decorated with Florentine mosaics by José Ramalho in 1695.

On the wall are three religious azulejos dating from 1741, depicting scenes from the life of St. John the Baptist

The refectory and the claustro are decorated with exquisite azulejos, some dating from Moorish times, others from the 16th to the 18th centuries.

One enters the chapter house through a Manueline portal from the quadra of St. John the Evangelist. The ribbed vault of this square room was distempered during the renovations of 1727. The walls are covered with Arab-Hispanic azulejos with geometric and vegetal designs that are among the most important ceramic decorations in Portugal. Above the azulejos are some semicircular distempered paintings with religious themes: St. John the Baptist, St. John the Evangelist, St. Christopher, St. Clare and St. Francis of Assisi.

The museum houses also an important collection of Flemish, Spanish and Portuguese paintings from the 15th to the 18th centuries, among them:

 Flemish paintings: [[:Image:Beja41.jpg|Virgin with Milk]]; Flemish School (c. 1530) and "Christ and His Apostles" (16th century)
 Portuguese paintings: Ecce Homo (15th century), "St. Vincent by Vicente Gil and Manuel Vicente (16th century), "Virgin with the Rose" by Francisco Campos (16th century), "Mass of St. Gregory" probably by Gregório Lopes (16th century), "Annunciation" (16th century) and four paintings by António Nogueira (16th century), "Last Supper" by Pedro Alexandrino (17th century).
 Spanish paintings: St. Augustine, St. Jerome and "Martyrdom of St. Bartholomew" by José de Ribera (Spanish, 17th century), Head of Saint John the Baptist (Spanish School, 17th century)

The museum houses also the funeral monuments in late-Gothic style of the first abbess D. Uganda and of the Infante Fernando, Duke of Viseu and his wife Beatriz of Portugal.

The archaeological collection of Fernando Nunes Ribeiro, donated to museum in 1987 after forty years of archaeological research, is on display on the upper floors: Visigothic and Roman artefacts, gravestones from the Bronze Age with antique writings of the Iberians and steles from the Iron Age.

Among the several other artefacts in its collection, the museum possesses the Escudela de Pero de Faria, a unique piece of Chinese porcelain from 1541.

Museums and monuments
 Castle of Beja
 Regional Museum (Housed in the Convent of Beja)
 Museological Core of Sembrano's Street
 Visigotic Core of the Regional Museum (Housed in the Church of Santo Amaro)
 Old Stone Pillory
 Roman ruins of Pisões
 Jorge Vieira's Art Museum

Historical churches
 Cathedral of St. James the Great, Beja
 Heritage of Santo André
 Church of Santo Amaro / Visigotic Core of the Regional Beja Museum
 Church of Mercy
 Our Lady of Conception Convent (Convent of Beja) / REGIONAL MUSEUM
 S. Francisco Convent (Now a Historical Hotel)
 Church of Santa Maria da Feira (Originally Built as a Mosque)
 Church of Our Lady of Pleasures
 Church of Our Lady at the Foot of the Cross
 Church of Our Lady of Peace
 Church of the Savior
 Church of Our Lady of Carmo
 St. Stephen's Chapel
 S. Sebastião's Heritage
 Convent of Santo António

Urban green spaces
 Public Garden
 City Park
 Picnic Park (Close to the City Park)

Economy
Known as the breadbasket of Portugal, the region's agriculture is a mainstay of the local economy. It produces wheat, wines and olives. Tourism has also importance due to sunny weather, a long history and many cultural attractions including a 13th-century castle and a number of museums. The military airport of Beja, 9 kilometers away, has been converted and was opened for civilian flights in 2011. The Portuguese wet lease airline Hi Fly operated its Airbus A380, purchased second-hand in 2018, from Beja, as well as other airplanes of its fleet. A highway was constructed to link Beja to the deepwater port of Sines about 60 kilometers away.

Education
Higher education
Polytechnic Institute of Beja

Schools
 EB 2,3 Santiago Maior School
 EB 2,3 Mário Beirão School
 EB 2,3 Santa Maria School
 D. Manuel I - High School
 Diogo Gouveia - High School
 Regional Music Conservatory from Baixo Alentejo

Culture
Cultural places
 Beja Public Library
 Pax Julia Theater
 Casa da Culture (meaning House of Culture)

Events
 Ovibeja 
 Patrimónios do Sul
 Beja Romana (Historical Recreation from Roman Times)
 International Comics Festival
 Palavras Andarilhas

 Notable citizens

 Abu al-Walid al-Baji (c. 1013–c.1081) a goldsmith and Maliki scholar
 Al-Mu'tamid ibn Abbad (1040–1095), the third and last ruler of the taifa of Seville in Al-Andalus.
 Gonçalo Mendes da Maia (1079–1170) a knight in the service of Afonso Henriques, responsible for border defence of Beja.
 Queen Eleanor of Viseu (1458–1525) an infanta (princess) and later queen consort of Portugal.
 Diogo de Gouveia (c.1471-1557) a teacher, theologian, diplomat and humanist during the Renaissance.
 André de Gouveia (1497–1548) a humanist and pedagogue during the Renaissance.
 António de Gouveia (c.1505–1566) a humanist and educator during the Renaissance.
 Mariana Alcoforado (1640–1723) a nun who wrote the Letters of a Portuguese Nun 
 José Agostinho de Macedo (1761–1831) a Portuguese poet and prose writer
 Tomás António Garcia Rosado (1854–1937) an infantry officer, general of the Portuguese Army, Governor of Mozambique, 1902-1905 and Ambassador to the UK, 1926-1934.
 António Maria Baptista (1866–1920) a military officer and politician, President of the Ministry in 1920
 Deolinda Lopes Vieira (1888–1993) a teacher, an anarcho-syndicalist activist and feminist
 Mário Beirão (1890-1965) a Portuguese poet
 Maria Lucília Estanco Louro (1922-2018) a teacher, pacifist and opponent of the Estado Novo regime
 Catarina Eufémia (1928-1954) a harvester and political murder victim in Beja
 Linda de Suza (born 1948) a singer, actress and best-selling author
 Tonicha (born 1946) real name Antónia de Jesus Montes Tonicha, a pop-folk singer.
 Cândida Branca Flor (1949–2001) an entertainer and traditional singer
 Carlos Moedas (born 1970) European Commissioner 2014-2019 
 António Zambujo (born 1975) a singer and songwriter

 Sport 
 Fernando Mamede (born 1951) a former athlete, a long distance running specialist
 Quim (born 1967) real name Joaquim Manuel Aguiar Serafim, a retired footballer with 436 for Vitória F.C.  
 Pedro Caixinha (born 1970) a football manager currently with Cruz Azul
 Manuel Damião (born 1978) a middle- and long-distance runner
 China (born 1982), real name João Pedro dos Santos Gonçalves'', a footballer with over 350 club caps 
 João Aurélio (born 1988) a professional footballer with over 300 club caps

References

Notes

Sources

External links

 Town Hall official website
 Museum Queen Eleanor (in Portuguese)
 Carmel of Beja (in Portuguese)

 
Populated places in Beja District
Burial sites of the House of Aviz
Municipalities of Beja District